The 2017 Georgia Firebirds season was the second season for the professional indoor football franchise and first in the National Arena League (NAL).  The Firebirds were one of eight teams that competed in the NAL for its inaugural 2017 season

Led by head coach Antwone Savage, the Firebirds played their home games at the Albany Civic Center. In May 2017, the league apparently took over operations of the Firebirds for the remainder of the season. As a result, the league cancelled the Firebirds' away game at the Corpus Christi Rage (another team the league was operating) as a cost-cutting measure.

Standings

Schedule

Regular season
The 2017 regular season schedule was released on December 9, 2016

Key: 

All start times are local time

Roster

References

Georgia Firebirds
Georgia Firebirds
Georgia Firebirds